Champions is an American television sitcom created by Charlie Grandy and Mindy Kaling that premiered on NBC on March 8, 2018. The series stars Anders Holm, Fortune Feimster, Andy Favreau, Josie Totah, and Mouzam Makkar.

On June 29, 2018, NBC canceled the series after one season.

Premise
Vince, a charismatic gym owner, is living every bachelor's dream with his younger brother Matthew in Brooklyn, New York. He lives a simple life, dates an endless string of women, until his high school fling Priya drops off their 15-year-old son Michael.

Cast and characters

Main

 Anders Holm as Vince Cook, a gym owner living in Brooklyn, New York with his brother Matthew, until Priya, his ex girlfriend, drops Michael (his son) off to live with him.
 Fortune Feimster as Ruby, Vince and Matthew's childhood friend and a trainer at the gym.
 Andy Favreau as Matthew Cook, Vince's younger brother, who is absent-minded most times.
 Josie Totah as Michael Prashant Patel, a talented and ambitious theater-kid, Vince's son, and Matthew's nephew.
 Mouzam Makkar as Britney, Vince's on-again, off-again girlfriend and a trainer at the gym.

Recurring
 Yassir Lester as Shabaz, a trainer at the gym.
 Ginger Gonzaga as Dana, the bookkeeper at the gym.
 Robert Costanzo as Uncle Bud, a trainer at the gym.
 Mindy Kaling as Priya Patel, Michael's mother, who drops him off to live with his father Vince, so Michael can attend a prestigious performing arts school.
 Kevin Quinn as Gregg, a classmate of Michael's.
 Edgar Blackmon as Dean Pasquesi, the dean of Michael's school.
 Jon Rudnitsky as Asher, Dana's boyfriend.

Guest
 Hasan Minhaj as Ro ("My Fair Uncle"), Michael's uncle and Priya's brother.
 Karan Brar as Arjun ("Vincemas"), a student at Michael's school.
 Carolyn Hennesy as Gayle ("Grandma Dearest"), Vince and Matthew's mother.
 Kether Donohue as Denise ("Grandma Dearest")
 Aloma Wright as Sister Timothy ("Matt Bomer Poster")

Episodes

Production

Development
On October 5, 2016, it was announced that NBC had given a put pilot commitment to an untitled script by Mindy Kaling and Charlie Grandy. The project stemmed from a writing, producing, and acting deal that Kaling had signed with Universal Television during the previous summer. Universal Television was set to produce the pilot alongside Kaling International and 3 Arts Entertainment. Kaling and Grandy were expected to executive produce alongside Howard Klein.

On January 26, 2017, it was announced that NBC had officially given the production a pilot order. The announcement was accompanied by the reveal of the series' premise. On May 13, 2017, it was announced that NBC had given the production a series order. Michael Alan Spiller was announced to be an executive producer for the series and it was reported that he was also expected to direct. Eyes Up Productions was also added to the list of production companies involved with the series.

On June 29, 2018, it was announced that NBC had officially cancelled the series. Before the cancellation was announced, producers had reportedly been in talks with Netflix, which carries the series internationally, about potentially picking up the show but the discussions ultimately did not lead to a renewal. Producers were still said to be searching for a potential new home for the series. On September 13, 2018, it was announced that the series had failed to find a new home.

Casting
Alongside the announcement of the series' pilot order, it was announced that Mindy Kaling had been cast in the pilot in the potentially recurring role of Priya. In February 2017, it was announced that Mouzam Makkar, Anders Holm, Andy Favreau, and Josie Totah had joined the pilot in potential series regular roles. On March 6, 2017, it was announced that Nina Wadia had been cast in a series regular role. On October 6, 2017, it was reported that Fortune Feimster had joined the main cast. On December 13, 2017, it was announced that Ginger Gonzaga had been cast in a recurring role.

Broadcast
The series is currently available through Netflix in the United Kingdom, Australia, Italy, United States, Canada, México, India, Ireland, Argentina, France and Germany.

Reception

Critical response
The series received positive reviews from critics upon its premiere. On the review aggregation website Rotten Tomatoes, the series holds a 63% approval rating with an average rating of 6.23 out of 10 based on 19 reviews. The website's critical consensus reads, "Champions has a charming cast and good-natured approach to sensitive issues which make it a worthwhile watch." Metacritic, which uses a weighted average, assigned the series a score of 64 out of 100 based on 13 reviews, indicating "generally favorable reviews.

In a positive review, the San Francisco Chronicles David Wiegand said, "Kaling and co-creator Grandy use plot as a display case for consistently funny writing and sweet and credible performances by the ensemble cast and, most of all, the exceptional skills of J.J. Totah, who plays Priya and Vince's proudly out son, Michael." In a more mixed review, Daniel Fienberg of The Hollywood Reporter said that Totah is "clearly talented in a variety of ways" and "gets the best punchlines in the early episodes", but that her "extremely focused myopia doesn't always track believably and the show has yet to figure out how to make Michael's schooling a part of the show in any real way. ... The show's workplace zaniness is definitely where Champions is most a work-in-progress." Varietys Sonia Saraiya offered the show restrained praise saying, "With a little adjustment, Champions could be fantastic. The exceptionally diverse cast brings a lot to the table, and the writing is smart and fresh. But right now it's a bit too disjointed to be a complete success." Particular praise was received for Josie Totah's performance as Michael; The New York Times Margaret Lyons called Totah's performance "superb," saying that Totah's "comic energy is astoundingly well calibrated," and that Totah "allows just enough genuine humanity to show through Michael's haughty, campy fieriness."

Ratings

Notes

References

External links
 
 

2010s American LGBT-related comedy television series
2010s American single-camera sitcoms
2010s LGBT-related sitcoms
2018 American television series debuts
2018 American television series endings
English-language television shows
NBC original programming
Television series by 3 Arts Entertainment
Television series by Universal Television
Television series about dysfunctional families
Television shows set in New York City
American LGBT-related sitcoms
Television series created by Mindy Kaling